The Telephone Operator (Italian: La telefonista) is a 1932 Italian comedy film directed by Nunzio Malasomma and starring Isa Pola, Mimì Aylmer and Luigi Cimara. It was a remake of the German film Wrong Number, Miss, released the same year.

The future star María Denis had a small role in the film.

Cast
 Isa Pola as La telefonista 
 Mimì Aylmer as La 'mannequin' 
 Luigi Cimara as Il direttore del telefoni 
 Sergio Tofano as Bàttigo - the tenor 
 Camillo Pilotto as La cameraman 
 Giovanni Grasso as Gedeone 
 Marcella Rovena as Bàttigo's wife

References

Bibliography 
 Reich, Jacqueline & Garofalo, Piero. Re-viewing Fascism: Italian Cinema, 1922-1943. Indiana University Press, 2002.
 Mancini, Elaine. Struggles of the Italian film industry during fascism, 1930-1935. UMI Research Press, 1985.

External links 
 

1932 films
Italian comedy films
Italian black-and-white films
1932 comedy films
1930s Italian-language films
Films directed by Nunzio Malasomma
Italian remakes of foreign films
Remakes of German films
Telephony in popular culture
1930s Italian films